Jonathan Horacio de León Ochoa (born June 22, 1987) is a Mexican footballer who plays for Municipal Liberia.

External links
 
 

1987 births
Living people
Mexican expatriate footballers
Tigres UANL footballers
Orange County SC players
Querétaro F.C. footballers
Expatriate soccer players in the United States
Liga MX players
USL Championship players
Footballers from Nuevo León
Association football midfielders
Mexican footballers